The 2020–21 Gonzaga Bulldogs men's basketball team represented  Gonzaga University, located in Spokane, Washington, in the 2020–21 NCAA Division I men's basketball season. The team was led by head coach Mark Few, in his 22nd season as head coach. This was the Bulldogs' 17th season at the on-campus McCarthey Athletic Center and 41st season as a member of the West Coast Conference.

The Bulldogs became the first undefeated team to advance to the national championship game since Indiana State in 1979. Gonzaga lost to fellow 1-seed Baylor in the championship game 86–70, denying the Bulldogs a perfect season.

Previous season

The Bulldogs finished the season 31–2, 15–1 in WCC play to be WCC regular-season champions. They then defeated San Francisco and Saint Mary's to be champions of the WCC tournament. They earned the WCC's automatic bid to the NCAA tournament. However, all postseason play, including the NCAA Tournament, was cancelled amid the COVID-19 pandemic. The Bulldogs finished #2 in the final AP and Coaches poll.

Offseason

Coaching changes

Departures

Additions to staff

Player departures

Incoming transfers

Recruiting classes

2020 recruiting class

2021 recruiting class

Roster
 Roster is subject to change as/if players transfer or leave the program for other reasons.
 Andrew Nembhard was initially ruled as a redshirt prior to the start of the 2020–21 season. However, on November 24, 2020, the NCAA granted him immediate eligibility. Additionally, the NCAA has granted an additional year of eligibility to all individuals who participate in winter sports during the 2020–21 school year. Nembhard will thus have 3 years of eligibility remaining at the start of the 2020–21 season.
 Ben Gregg joined the team on December 17, 2020, after graduating high school early.

Coaching staff

Schedule and results
Until the championship game, Gonzaga was the only NCAA basketball team, either men's or women's, to remain undefeated in every game (within and outside its conference) during the 2020–21 season. During the championship game, Baylor University became the season champions after defeating Gonzaga 86–70. 

|-
!colspan=12 style=| Non-conference regular season

|-
!colspan=12 style=|  WCC Regular Season

|-
!colspan=12 style=| WCC Tournament

|-
!colspan=12 style=| NCAA tournament

Source

Rankings

^Coaches did not release a Week 1 poll.

References

Gonzaga Bulldogs men's basketball seasons
Gonzaga
Gonzaga Bulldogs men's basketball
Gonzaga Bulldogs men's basketball
Gonzaga
NCAA Division I men's basketball tournament Final Four seasons